William Martyn may refer to:

 William Martyn (Lord Mayor) (c. 1446–1503), Sheriff of London and Lord Mayor of London
 William Óge Martyn (died 1592), mayor of Galway
 William Martyn (historian) (1562–1617), English lawyer and historian
 Will Martyn (born 2001), Australian rules footballer

See also
 William Martin (disambiguation)